Kaleköy (literally "Castle's village" in Turkish;  - Simena) is a village of the Demre district in the Antalya Province of Turkey, located between Kaş and Demre, on the Mediterranean coast. Kaleköy faces the island of Kekova, and can be reached by sea or on foot from Üçağız.

The village lies amidst a Lycian necropolis, which is partially sunken underwater. Kaleköy is overlooked by a Byzantine castle, built in the Middle Ages to fight the pirates who nested in Kekova. The castle contains a small theatre.

Kaleköy is a popular yachting destination.

See also
 Lycia
 Turkish Riviera

Villages in Demre District
Lycia
Ancient Greek archaeological sites in Turkey
Submerged places